Fox Sports Australia Pty Limited (formerly Premier Media Group Pty Limited) is the division of Foxtel that owns and operates the Fox Sports television networks and digital properties in Australia. The group operates nine Fox Sports Channels as well as Fox Sports News, Fox Cricket, Fox League, Fox Footy, Watch AFL and Watch NRL. Fox Sports channels are available via Foxtel or Kayo. The group's main competitors are beIN Sports, ESPN, Optus Sport and Stan Sport. Unlike Fox Sports (United States) the group is not owned directly by the Fox Corporation. However News Corp which holds a 65% stake in Foxtel is Fox Corporation's sister company.

History

Early years

Launch
Fox Sports started life as the Premier Sports Network (later just Premier Sports) as the only fully operational local channel at the launch of Australia's first pay-television service, Galaxy. Premier Sports' backers included American company Prime International, which later became part of Liberty Media. The service was launched at 16:00 on 26 January 1995 in Sydney, and made a name for itself, securing the rights to Australia's cricket tour of the West Indies. Previously Australian cricket tours had been covered on the Nine Network on free-to-air, and Nine tried to stop the broadcast under Australia's anti-siphoning rules, which state that certain popular sporting events cannot be screened exclusively on pay television. PSN signed a deal with Network 10 to share the broadcast rights.

Foxtel launch
When Foxtel launched its cable service later that year, PSN was included as part of the package. Between 1995 and 2010, Fox Sports aired National Basketball League (NBL) games. On 1 March 1996, PSN was relaunched as Fox Sports Australia, to coincide with the new Super 12 rugby union competition and the proposed launch of the Super League.

In 1997 a secondary channel was launched on Foxtel to carry broadcasts of the new Super League competition. Fox Sports and its chief competitor, Sports Australia shared the rights to NRL broadcasts as a result of the legal settlement in the Super League war. The channel on Foxtel was later relaunched as Fox Sports Two, at first broadcasting from Friday through Monday each week, and later expanding to a full 24-hour, 7-day service in 2002.

2000s

Optus launch
When Optus Vision dropped the C7 Sport service in March 2002, they started carrying the Fox Sports channels. These were referred to by Optus as "Optus Sports 1" and "Optus Sports 2" in Optus promotional material; on-air programming referred to the channels as simply "Sports One" and "Sports Two", although programming such as the nightly Fox Sports News bulletins retained the Fox name.  Optus dropped the "Optus Sports" name in October 2002.

Fox Sports Two was generally used to cover bigger events that require large amounts of air time, such as the 1998 Winter Olympics, Grand Slam tennis tournaments, and the 2004 European Football Championship. It now specialises as a 24/7, dedicated Rugby league channel, Fox League.

During the 2006 Commonwealth Games in Melbourne, Fox Sports carried an additional eight channels dedicated to Games events. These were available to customers at an additional charge.

Fox Sports was the exclusive broadcaster of the A-League from its first season in 2005 until 2020. In 2006, an A$120 million deal between the Football Federation Australia and Fox Sports was reached after the end of the first season. Under the deal, Fox Sports had exclusive rights from 2007 to all Socceroos home internationals, all A-League and Asian Cup fixtures, World Cup qualifiers through the Asian Football Confederation, and all AFC Champions League matches.

The deal to cover the A-league live and exclusive reaped big rewards for Fox Sports, its ratings were very strong in the 2006-07 season and the 2007 A-league grand final became at the time, Fox Sports' highest ever rating event.

Ratings for football have generally been very good. The Socceroos first game of the 2007 AFC Asian Cup, attracted 345,000 viewers, while their Quarter final drew an average of 419,000 - at the time, an all-time record for Australian Pay TV. This record was broken on 1 April 2009, when the Socceroos defeated Uzbekistan to put them very close to qualification for the 2010 FIFA World Cup. This match was watched by an average of 431,000 people.

In 2007, Fox Sports reached a deal to broadcast 4 games live and exclusive from the AFL each week. This includes the exclusive only Sunday twilight match. In addition they will broadcast Friday night games live into New South Wales and Queensland via channel 518 at no extra charge - normally used for pay-per-view service Main Event. When channel 518 is used in this way it is promoted as Fox Sports Plus on-air.

The channel is being used increasingly to show live events when Fox Sports has a clash involving its main 3 channels. On Saturday 17 March 2007, for example, Fox Sports broadcast a match from the 2007 Cricket World Cup (Ireland v Pakistan) live on 518, as it was committed to football, rugby union and another cricket match on its main 3 channels.

2010s
In 2010 Fox Sports coverage of National Rugby League games held 73 out of the top 100 programs of any type aired on Foxtel. In February 2012, the Premier Media Group changed its name to Fox Sports Pty Limited.

In February 2012, Premier Media Group changed its name to Fox Sports, with CEO Patrick Delany explaining "The change from Premier Media to Fox Sports provides a stronger reflection of the core business of the company in its name, which is, and will continue to be, sport."

On 2 November 2012, News Corp took control of Consolidated Media Holdings after a $2 billion merger was approved by the Australian Competition & Consumer Commission, Federal Court and Consolidated Media Holding shareholders, making News Corp 100% owner of Fox Sports Pty Ltd. In April 2018 News Corp Australia moved the ownership of the company to one of its subsidiaries Foxtel a joint venture with Telstra.

On 5 March 2013, Fox Sports unveiled its new headquarters at Gore Hill in Sydney. It was announced that the main studio would be named the Clive Churchill Studio after rugby league immortal Clive Churchill, as the studio will house NRL coverage. Technical innovations were the main highlight, with CEO Patrick Delany unveiling the FoxKopter, the FoxMobile Segway, Ref Cam and Cornerpost Cam. Fox Sports also launched a new corporate logo in line with its global affiliate broadcasters.

On 3 September 2014, Fox Sports announced that SPEED and Fuel TV would be rebranded as Fox Sports 4 and Fox Sports 5 on 3 November 2014, of which both will be available in HD. In addition, it was announced that FOX Sports News would launch a HD feed on the same day, taking FOX Sports' suite to 7 channels, all available in HD.

On 23 February 2017, Fox Sports More+, a new channel for live, pop-up events was launched.

Fox Sports News

Channels 
Fox Sports News: Channel 500. On 3 November 2014, Fox Sports News launched a HD simulcast. In addition, it moved from channel 513 to channel 500.
Fox Cricket: Channel 501. Branded as Fox Sports 1 prior to 23 February 2017, then branded as Fox Sports 501 from 23 February 2017 to 17 September 2018.
Fox League: Channel 502. Branded as Fox Sports 2 prior to 23 February 2017, then branded as Fox Sports 502 from 23 February 2017 to 27 February 2017.
Fox Sports 503: Channel 503. Branded as Fox Sports 3 prior to 23 February 2017.
Fox Footy: Channel 504. Branded as Fox Sports 504 prior to 17 February 2012.
Fox Sports 505: Channel 505. Branded as Fox Sports 4 prior to 23 February 2017.
Fox Sports 506: Channel 506. Branded as Fox Sports 5 prior to 23 February 2017.
Fox Sports More+: Channel 507. Although broadcast 24/7, the channel only acts as a pop-up channel with only occasional programming.
Fox Sports 508: Channel 508. On 21 February 2022, the Fox Sports Ultra HD channel 508 was removed to allow for an increased offering of Ultra HD Sports content from 11 March 2022 with the commencement of the NRL and AFL seasons.
Fox Sports UHD 1: Channel 591.
Fox Sports UHD 2: Channel 592.
Fox Sports UHD 3: Channel 593.
Fox Sports UHD 4: Channel 594.

Former channels
Fox Sports 501: Channel 501. Also available in HD. Replaced by Fox Cricket.
Fox Sports 502: Channel 502. Also available in HD. Replaced by Fox League.
Fox Sports 504: Channel 504. Also available in HD. Replaced by Fox Footy.
Fox Sports Plus: Launched on 6 September 2012, the channel showed what live and upcoming sports were available via Viewer's Choice on Fox Sports 1, 2, 3, 4, and 5. The channel ceased broadcasting on 9 February 2017, and was replaced on 23 February 2017 by Fox Sports More+.
Fuel TV (replaced by Fox Sports 505)
Main Event: The Main Event channel was used as an "overflow" channel when multiple live sporting events needed to be broadcast. This included Friday Night AFL in New South Wales, Queensland and Australian Capital Territory and Saturday Nights in New South Wales (excluding the Wagga Wagga market) and Canberra. It was also used nationwide for a Socceroos game in June 2007. On many occasions the Main Event channel was used when the Premier League had multiple games on the one night, although usage in this capacity is rare now that the "Viewer's Choice" system of showing multiple matches on one channel through multi-casting (pressing the "Red Button" on a Foxtel/Austar remote control). Unlike the AFL, the NRL was never broadcast into Southern Australia through Fox Sports Plus on Friday nights, leaving its Southern Australian fans having to wait until at least after midnight for a replay of the match on local free-to-air channels up until 2012.
Speed (replaced by Fox Sports 506)
Footy Play powered by Fox Sports (available on Xbox 360, Telstra T-Box, and Foxtel on Internet TV).
Sports Play powered by Fox Sports (available on Xbox 360, Telstra T-Box, and Foxtel on Internet TV until 2013, when Fox Sports 1-3 launched on these services.)
Fox Sports Ultra HD: Channel 508 in 4K Ultra HD. Channel ended on 10 March 2022 as Foxtel replaced it with "a brand-new Ultra HD sport destination" for when 4K events are broadcasting at the same time.

Programming

Current programming
 The Back Page
 E-League (Australia)
 Fight Call Out (2017–present)
 Fox Fans League
 Fox Sports FC
 The Golf Show
 Hammer Time
 Inside Rugby
 Inside Supercars
 Supercars Trackside
 Kick Off
 Matchday Saturday
 Monday Night with Matty Johns (2013–present)
 NRL 360 (2013–present)
 Shoot Out
 Supercars Life
 UFC Fight Week

Former programming
 Bill & Boz (2017–2019)
 Inside Cricket
 The Crew (2013–2015)
 On the Couch with Sterlo (2013–2017)
 Santo, Sam and Ed's Total Football (2013–2015)

Sports/competitions televised by Fox Sports

Australian rules football
 Australian Football League Premiership Season (Broadcasts three matches live during most weekends of the regular season whenever sister channel Fox Footy, is screening another LIVE match at the same time. Fox Sports occasionally screens other programming such as magazine and panel shows that are produced and broadcast by Fox Footy.

Basketball
FIBA World Cup
EuroLeague
National Basketball League (All games live on ESPN, including semi-finals and Grand Final) (Shared with 10 Peach)
 Women's National Basketball League (Shared with ABC)

Combat sports
 Cage Fighting Championship
 Evolution
 Fight Call Out (2017–present)
 Fox Sports Friday Night Fights
 Hammer Time
 Knees of Fury
 Legend MMA
 Maximus Academy
 UFC Fight Week
 The Ultimate Fighter

Cricket
 Australian national cricket team International Test Cricket (Shared with Seven Network)
 Australian national cricket team One-day Internationals
 Australian national cricket team Twenty20 Internationals
 Australian national cricket team International Women's Test Cricket (Simulcast of Seven Network coverage)
 Australian national cricket team Women's One-day Internationals (Simulcast of Seven Network coverage)
 Australian national cricket team Women's Twenty20 Internationals (Simulcast of Seven Network coverage)
 Australian domestic First-class Sheffield Shield final
 Australian domestic List A JLT One-Day Cup
 Australian domestic Twenty20 Big Bash League all 61 games (43 Shared with Seven Network)
 Australian domestic Women's Twenty20 Women's Big Bash League (Simulcast of Seven Network coverage)
 Home series of the England cricket team
 Home series of the West Indies cricket team
 Home series of the New Zealand cricket team
 Home series of the South African cricket team
 Home series of the Pakistan cricket team
 Home series of the Sri Lankan cricket team
 Home series of the Indian cricket team
 Global T20 Canada
 Caribbean Premier League
 Hong Kong T20 Blitz

Darts
 PDC World Darts Championship
 PDC World Cup of Darts
 Premier League Darts

Field hockey
 Men's FIH Pro League
 Women's FIH Pro League
 Oceania Cup
 Hockey India League

Golf
 American PGA Tour (All rounds)
 European PGA Tour
 Champions Tour
 Women's major golf championships
 Asian Tour (highlights)
 US Open
The Masters Tournament
The Open Championship
PGA Championship

Ice hockey
 Australian Ice Hockey League (Match of the round and highlights)

Motorsport

Formula racing
 Formula One

Open wheel
 FIA Formula 2 Championship
 FIA Formula 3 Championship
 Indy Lights
 Toyota Racing Series

Stock Cars 
 NASCAR Cup Series
 NASCAR Xfinity Series
 NASCAR Camping World Truck Series

Touring Cars
 Supercars Championship (shared with Seven Network)
 World Touring Car Cup
 British Touring Car Championship
 DTM
 Shannons Nationals Motor Racing Championships
 Summernats

Sportscars 
 Australian GT Championship
 Bathurst 12 Hour
 Michelin Pilot Challenge
 Dubai 24 Hour
 FIA European Truck Racing Championship
 24 Hours Nürburgring
 Shannons Nationals Motor Racing Championships
 FIA World Endurance Championship

Drag racing 
 ANDRA Pro Series

Bikes 
 MotoGP (shared with Network Ten)
 Superbike World Championship (shared with SBS)
 British Superbike Championship
 Australian Superbike Championship

Rally 
 World Rally Championship (shared with 10 Bold)
 Australian Rally Championship (shared with 10 Bold)
 British Rally Championship
 European Rally Championship
 European Rallycross Championship

Speedway 
 FIM Speedway Grand Prix
 FIM Speedway World Cup
 British Elite Speedway
 World Series Sprintcars
 Australian Sprintcar Championship
 Chequered Flag
 FIM Ice Speedway World Championship
 Grand Annual Sprintcar Classic
 World of Speedway

Motocross 
 AMA Motocross Championship
 Australian Supercross Championship
 British Motocross Championship
 FIM Enduro World Championship
 FIM Motocross World Championship
 FIM MX of Nations
 FIM Supermoto
 MXTV

Rugby league 
 National Rugby League (Every Game Live, 5 games Live and Exclusive and 3 game simulcast Live with Nine in a full round). Fox Sports occasionally screens other programming such as new magazine and panel shows that are produced and broadcast by Fox League.
 Holden Cup (2008–2017)
 New South Wales Cup
 Rugby Football League's Super League

Rugby union 
 Super Rugby (All games live and exclusive) (1995–2020)
 Super W (All games live and exclusive) (2018–2020)
 The Rugby Championship (shared with Network Ten) (1995–2020)
 Wallabies internationals (shared with Network Ten) (1995–2020)
 Global Rapid Rugby (shared with SBS Sport)
 National Rugby Championship
 Currie Cup
 ITM Cup

Soccer 
 Hyundai A-League (All games live, Saturday night matches shared with ABC TV) (2004–2021)
 Hyundai A-League Finals Series (All games live, shared with ABC TV) (2004–2021)
 Asian Champions League (All games involving Australian teams live, plus some others) (2021)
 AFC Asian Cup (All Games, 28 games (include the Socceroos team) exclusively live) (2021)
 Socceroos internationals (All games include AFC Asian cup and exclude FIFA World Cup finals games, shared with SBS Viceland (two matches only) and ABC TV for the World Cup qualification second round) (2021)
Indian Super League (2021)
 Other separate International Football matches
 Westfield W-League (One live match per week, plus both semi-finals and the grand final live; shared with ABC TV) (2015–2021)

Surfing 
 World Surf League (All events live)

Ten-pin bowling 
 Rollin' Thunder
 Weber Cup

Tennis 
 World Tennis Challenge
 Moorilla Hobart International
 ATP 250 Series; Open Sud de France, Quito Open, Memphis Open, Geneva Open) 
 WTA Tour (replays)
 Hawaii Open

Availability 
Fox Sports is available nationally and is available on Foxtel's My Sport package and Optus featuring Foxtel's Total Sport package.

See also 

List of sports television channels

References

External links 
 
 Fox Sports Broadcast the Champions Trophy ODI Cricket Match Live in Australia

 
Television channels and stations established in 1995
1995 establishments in Australia
English-language television stations in Australia
Prime Sports